Institut Catholique may refer to:

Institut Catholique de Paris
Institute Catholique a school for orphans in New Orleans